Vietnam-Russia Tropical Centre (Vietnamese: Trung tâm nhiệt đới Việt Nga, Russian: Российско-вьетнамский тропический научно-исследовательский и технологический центр) is a scientific research organization in Vietnam. This centre was established in 1988 by an agreement between the Ministry of National Defense (Vietnam) and Russian Academy of Sciences. This centre is specializing in researching of sciences from tropical biology, medicine, environmental pollution and treatments such dioxin effects in Vietnam. It is headquartered in Hanoi and has branches in Ho Chi Minh City and Nha Trang, with a field station in Cat Tien National Park, where it maintains a meteorology tower.

Governmental office in Hanoi
Education in Hanoi
Ho Chi Minh City